Cristian Gabriel Chávez (born 4 June 1987, in Lomas de Zamora) is an Argentine football winger or forward, who plays for Godoy Cruz, on loan from Club Atlético Independiente.

Career

From San Lorenzo to Napoli and the homecoming 

Chávez made his league debut for San Lorenzo in a 1–0 win to Racing Club on March 7, 2008. In the 2008 Copa Libertadores he scored a goal in a 3–2 victory against Real Potosí, helping San Lorenzo's comeback in the game. He was subsequently loaned to Godoy Cruz and Atlético Tucumán.

On August 14, 2011, he signed for the Italian club Napoli for €1.5 million.
On 10 February 2012 he went on loan to San Lorenzo.

PAS Giannina
In July 2013, he signed a three-year contract with PAS Giannina of the Superleague Greece. He made his debut with the club on 18 August 2013 in a 3–3 draw against Asteras Tripolis scoring the first goal.

Despite rumours linking him with a move to PAOK after his contract with PAS Giannina was terminated in January 2016

Due to his great performances, he soon became very popular along with the strong club's fans, he returned to Argentina.

Back to South America

In February 2016, he signed a one-and-a-half-year contract with Argentinian club Club Atletico Brown playing in the Primera B Nacional.

On 1 July 2017, he signed a one-year contract with the Paraguayan football team Club Guaraní.

On 5 January 2018, he signed with Argentinian club Aldosivi playing in the Primera B Nacional.

References

External links
Cristian Gabriel Chávez – Argentine Primera statistics at Fútbol XXI  

1987 births
Living people
People from Lomas de Zamora
Argentine footballers
Argentine expatriate footballers
Association football forwards
Sportspeople from Buenos Aires Province
San Lorenzo de Almagro footballers
Godoy Cruz Antonio Tomba footballers
Atlético Tucumán footballers
Club Almirante Brown footballers
S.S.C. Napoli players
Club Guaraní players
PAS Giannina F.C. players
Aldosivi footballers
Club Atlético Independiente footballers
Central Córdoba de Rosario footballers
Defensor Sporting players
Argentine Primera División players
Primera Nacional players
Serie A players
Paraguayan Primera División players
Super League Greece players
Expatriate footballers in Italy
Expatriate footballers in Greece
Expatriate footballers in Paraguay
Expatriate footballers in Uruguay
Argentine expatriate sportspeople in Italy
Argentine expatriate sportspeople in Greece
Argentine expatriate sportspeople in Paraguay
Argentine expatriate sportspeople in Uruguay